Emily Grace Hodgson (born 1 July 2000) is an Australian professional soccer player. She currently plays for Adelaide United in the W-League.

Club career

Adelaide United, 2016–
On 3 November 2016, Hodgson became part of the Adelaide United women's squad. She made her debut in a 3–3 draw against Melbourne Victory in the 2016–17 season of Round 1.

Early life 
Hodgson attended Torrens Valley Christian School throughout her high school years (grade 8–12) and graduated in 2018. Her studies were often interrupted through travel across Australia and the world for her soccer career.

References

External links
 

2000 births
Living people
A-League Women players
Adelaide United FC (A-League Women) players
Women's association football fullbacks
Australian women's soccer players